Grimaldo Turculis was a Roman Catholic prelate who served as Bishop of Giovinazzo (1395–1399?).

Biography
On 14 October 1395, he was appointed during the papacy of Pope Boniface IX as Bishop of Giovinazzo.
It uncertain how long he served as Bishop of Giovinazzo; the next bishop of record is Sixtus Coleta who was appointed in 1399.
While bishop, he was the principal co-consecrator of Angelo Marcuzzi, Bishop of Telese (1413)

References

External links and additional sources
 (for Chronology of Bishops) 
 (for Chronology of Bishops) 

Date of birth unknown
Date of death unknown
14th-century English Roman Catholic bishops
Bishops appointed by Pope Boniface IX